The Little Satilla Creek is a  tributary of the Little Satilla River in the U.S. state of Georgia. It is part of the Satilla River watershed in southeastern Georgia.

See also
List of rivers of Georgia

References 

USGS Hydrologic Unit Map - State of Georgia (1974)

Rivers of Georgia (U.S. state)
Rivers of Appling County, Georgia
Rivers of Wayne County, Georgia